Scobicia suturalis is a species of horned powder-post beetle in the family Bostrichidae. It is found in North America.

References

Further reading

 
 

Bostrichidae
Articles created by Qbugbot
Beetles described in 1878